Gianluca Grassadonia (born 20 May 1972) is an Italian professional football coach, most recently in charge as head coach of Serie C club Paganese.

Playing career
Born in Salerno, Grassadonia started his playing career by growing from the youth ranks of hometown club Salernitana and then making his senior debut in 1988. In 1992, he made his Serie A debut as a Foggia player. His longest stint as a player was between 1997 and 2003 with Cagliari, with whom he played 135 league games.

Coaching career
After retirement, Grassadonia took over a youth coaching role at Salernitana. In November 2009 he replaced Marco Cari as head coach, being however sacked later in March 2010 due to poor results. He successively served as head coach of Serie D club Casertana from February to June 2011.

In July 2011 he was named new head coach of Lega Pro Seconda Divisione club Paganese. After resigning from his post in January 2012, he returned to Paganese later in April and guided them to promotion through playoffs by the end of the season.

In December 2013 he took over at Messina, guiding them to win the Lega Pro Seconda Divisione season. He was sacked in March 2015 due to poor results.

In August 2015 he accepted to return to Paganese, guiding the small Campanian club to a surprising qualification to the promotion playoffs during the 2016–17 Lega Pro season.

In June 2017 he was named new head coach of Serie B club Pro Vercelli, replacing Moreno Longo. On 17 December 2017 he was sacked due to the poor results of the team and replaced by Gianluca Atzori. On 22 January 2018 he came back to Vercelli replacing Atzori. On 7 May 2018 he was resacked after the 5–1 away defeat against Spezia and replaced by Vito Grieco with the team in the relegation zone in 22nd place with 37 points. However Grieco, even if he won against the relegated team Ternana (2–1) did not avoid Pro Vercelli's relegation to Serie C.

On 30 June 2018 he was appointed as new Foggia head coach. He was removed from his managerial duties on 11 December 2018 after a string of negative results.

On 11 March 2019 he was appointed as new Foggia head coach.

On 21 October 2019 he signed a contract until the end of the 2019–20 season with Serie C club Catanzaro which will be automatically extended if Catanzaro achieves promotion to Serie B. He was dismissed by Catanzaro on 24 January 2020 following two consecutive losses.

On 14 February 2021 he was named new head coach of bottom-placed Serie B club Pescara, signing a contract until the end of the season.

On 5 September 2021, Grassadonia agreed to return in charge of his past club Paganese in the Serie C league. He was dismissed on 11 April 2022, leaving Paganese  third-last placed in the league table.

Managerial statistics

References

1972 births
Living people
Italian footballers
Association football defenders
U.S. Salernitana 1919 players
Calcio Foggia 1920 players
Cagliari Calcio players
Cosenza Calcio players
A.C. ChievoVerona players
S.S. Fidelis Andria 1928 players
S.S. Juve Stabia players
Serie A players
Serie B players
Serie C players
Italian football managers
U.S. Salernitana 1919 managers
A.C.R. Messina managers
F.C. Pro Vercelli 1892 managers
U.S. Catanzaro 1929 managers
Delfino Pescara 1936 managers
Serie B managers
Serie C managers